Nauru participated in the 2010 Summer Youth Olympics in Singapore.

The Nauru squad consisted of 4 athletes competing in 3 sports: athletics, boxing and weightlifting.

Medalists

Athletics

Girls
Track and Road Events

Boxing

Boys

Weightlifting

Boys

References

External links
Competitors List: Nauru

Nations at the 2010 Summer Youth Olympics
2010 in Nauruan sport
Nauru at the Youth Olympics